The Association for Computer Aided Design In Architecture (ACADIA) is a 501(c)(3) non-profit organization active in the area of computer-aided architectural design (CAAD).

Mission statement 
Begun in 1981, the organization's objectives are recorded in its bylaws:

"ACADIA was formed for the purpose of facilitating communication and information exchange regarding the use of computers in architecture, planning and building science. A particular focus is education and the software, hardware and pedagogy involved in education."

"The organization is also committed to the research and development of computer aides that enhance design creativity, rather than simply production, and that aim at contributing to the construction of humane physical environments."

Membership 
Membership is open to anyone who subscribes to the objectives of the organization, including architects, educators, and software developers, whether resident in North America or not. An online membership registration form and directory is available via the organization.

The organization is primarily governed by the elected Board of Directors. The organization is led by the elected President, who presides over Board of Directors meetings, but does not vote except in the case of a tie.

Presidents (elected)

Activities

Annual conference 
ACADIA sponsors an annual national conference, held in the autumn of each year at a different site in North America. Papers for the conferences undergo extensive blind review before being accepted for presentation (and publication). Membership is not a prerequisite for submission of a paper.

Proceedings 
Each year the conference papers are gathered into a proceedings publication which is distributed to members, and available to the public via the open access database CumInCAD.

Awards 

Started in 1998, ACADIA Awards of Excellence are "the highest award that can be achieved in the field of architectural computing". The awards are given in areas of practice, teaching, research and service, with at most one award in each category per year. Past awards have recognized various significant contributors to the field of architectural computing.

The current awards given annually or biannually are the Lifetime Achievement Award, the Digital Practice Award of Excellence, the Innovative Academic Program Award of Excellence, the Innovative Research Award of Excellence, the Society Award for Leadership, and the Teaching Award of Excellence.

Lifetime Achievement Award

Digital Practice Award of Excellence

Innovative Academic Program Award of Excellence

History

Related organizations

Sister organizations 
There are four sister organizations around the world to provide a more accessible regional forum for discussion of computing and design. The major ones are
 CAADRIA - The Association for Computer Aided Architectural Design in Asia, since 1996.
 SIGraDi - Iberoamerican Society of Digital Graphics, since 1997.
 ASCAAD - The Arab Society for Computer Aided Architectural Design, since 2001.

Other related organizations 
 CAAD Futures - Computer Aided Architectural Design Futures, since 1985.
 CUMINCAD - The Cumulative Index of Computer Aided Architectural Design,  with public CumInCAD records available via an Open Archives Initiative Protocol for Metadata Harvesting (OAI-PMH) feed and records are available via multiple bibliographic archives and citation indexes online.

References

External links
 Association for Computer Aided Design In Architecture

Information technology organizations based in North America
Architectural design
Architecture nonprofits in the United States
Charities based in North Dakota